Diogo Pinheiro Monteiro (born 28 January 2005) is a professional footballer who plays as a defender for Leeds United. Born in Switzerland, he represents Portugal internationally.

Club career
On 15 June 2020, Monteiro signed his first professional contract with Servette. He made his professional debut for Servette on 6 March 2021 in the Swiss Super League. At 16 years old, one month and nine days, Monteiro was the third youngest footballer to debut with Swiss Super League, and the youngest defender to do so.

On 31 January 2023, Monteiro joined Premier League side Leeds United for an undisclosed fee, signing a contract until June 2026 with the English club and being initially registered for the under-21 squad.

International career
With the national team, Diogo has more than 30 caps (U15, U16, U17 and U18). He has been the captain of the 2005 generation so far and he was a crucial player in the great campaign this generation had on the Euro championship in 2022, in Israel. Portugal reached the semi-finals and Diogo was the only portuguese player to have played every minute of the tournament.

References

External links

2005 births
Living people
Footballers from Geneva
Portuguese footballers
Portugal youth international footballers
Swiss men's footballers
Swiss people of Portuguese descent
Association football defenders
Swiss Super League players
Servette FC players
Swiss 1. Liga (football) players
Expatriate footballers in England
Leeds United F.C. players